Torine Charlotta Torines, née Torissen (11 April 1876 in Linköping – 5 July 1944 in Stockholm), was a Swedish mechanic, known in contemporary Sweden as "The only female mechanic in Scandinavia" and "Doctor of the Sewing machines".

Life
Torine Torines's parents managed the Torine's sewing machine's shop. She herself opened her own business as a mechanic in 1891 at the age of fifteen, with her mother as accountant.

The sewing machine had been introduced to Sweden in the 1850s and was from the 1860s onward so common that it was fully possible for her to support herself by repairing sewing machines. In the late 19th-century, female mechanics were uncommon enough for her to be famed as such, and she was quite possibly the first professional female mechanic in her country. She was very successful and worked as a sewing machine's mechanic for 45 years, until she left the business to her children in 1936.

Legacy
Torinetäppan, a park in Södermalm in Stockholm, was named after her in 1989.

References

19th-century Swedish businesspeople
1876 births
1944 deaths
Swedish women engineers
Swedish mechanical engineers
19th-century women engineers
19th-century Swedish businesswomen